The 1978–79 Sporting de Gijón season was the 19th season of the club in La Liga, the second in a row since the last promotion. This was the best season in the club's history, after finishing the league as runner-up and making its debut in European competitions.

Technical staff 

|}

Competitions

La Liga

League table

Positions by round

Matches

UEFA Cup

Copa del Rey

Statistics

Appearances and goals

See also
1978–79 La Liga
1978–79 Copa del Rey
1978–79 UEFA Cup

References

Sporting de Gijón seasons
Sporting de Gijon